The 2010-11 US Open Cup for Arena Soccer is the third edition of an open knockout style tournament for arena/indoor soccer. Teams from the Professional Arena Soccer League and Premier Arena Soccer League participated in the tournament.

US Open Arena Soccer Championship bracket

Confirmed dates and matchups
All times local

Round of 16
 Sat. Dec. 4, 3:05pm - California Cougars (PASL-Pro) 8, Top Notch San Jose (Independent) 7
 Sat. Dec. 4, 7:30pm - Cincinnati Kings (PASL-Pro) 11, Ohio Vortex (PASL-Pro) 8 (Doubles as regular season match)
 Fri. Dec. 10, 8:00pm - Louisville Lightning (PASL-Pro) 25, Evansville Crush (PASL-Premier) 3  
 Sat. Dec. 11, 1:00pm - Las Vegas Knights (PASL-Premier) 7, Fort Collins Fury (PASL-Premier) 4
 Sat. Dec. 11, 8:00pm - Illinois Piasa (PASL-Pro) 14, Springfield Demize (PASL-Pro) 7 (Doubles as regular season match)
 Sat. Dec. 18, 7:00pm - A.A.F.C. (Independent) 7, Detroit Waza (PASL-Pro) 6
 Sat. Dec. 18, 7:05pm - Tacoma Stars (PASL-Pro) 13, Dream Team (Independent) 5
 Wed. Dec. 29, 6:15pm - San Diego Sockers (PASL-Pro) 7, San Diego Fusion (PASL-Premier) 5

Quarterfinals
 Fri. Jan. 7, 8:30pm - Louisville Lightning (PASL-Pro) 23, A.A.F.C. (Independent) 5
 Sat. Jan. 15,7:05pm - Tacoma Stars (PASL-Pro) 7, California Cougars (PASL-Pro) 5 (Doubles as regular season match)
 Fri. Jan. 21,7:05pm - San Diego Sockers (PASL-Pro) 10 Las Vegas Knights (PASL-Premier) 9
 Fri. Feb. 4, 7:35pm - Cincinnati Kings (PASL-Pro) 11, Illinois Piasa (PASL-Pro) 2 (Doubles as regular season match)

Semifinals
 Sat. Feb. 5, 7:30pm - San Diego Sockers (PASL-Pro) 5, Tacoma Stars (PASL-Pro) 0 (Doubles as regular season match)
 Fri. Feb. 18, 7:35pm - Cincinnati Kings (PASL-Pro) 3, Louisville Lightning (PASL-Pro) 0 (Forfeit)

Finals
 Sat. Mar. 19,6:15pm - San Diego Sockers (PASL-Pro) 13, Cincinnati Kings (PASL-Pro) 6

Qualifying
Green indicates qualification for Qualifying Tournament Knockout Round(s)
Bold Indicates Qualifying Tournament Winner and qualification to US Arena Open Cup
All times local

Group Matches Sat. Oct. 9, 2010
12:00pm - Rochester Rhinos-Indiana 7, Paducah Wildcats 3
1:30pm - Louisville Lightning Reserves 5, UFC Eagles 1
3:00pm - Evansville Crush 6, Piasa FC 2
5:30pm - Louisville Lightning Reserves 2, Rochester Rhinos-Indiana 1
7:00pm - Evansville Crush 14, Paducah Wildcats 4
8:30pm - Piasa FC 5, UFC Eagles 3

Group Matches Sun. Oct. 10, 2010
9:00am - Rochester Rhinos-Indiana 3, Piasa FC 2
10:30am - UFC Eagles 6, Paducah Wildcats 5
12:00pm - Evansville Crush 4, Louisville Lightning Reserves 3

Third Place Sun. Oct. 10, 2010
1:30pm - Rochester Rhinos-Indiana 7, UFC Eagles 4

Final Sun. Oct. 10, 2010
3:00pm - Evansville Crush 7, Louisville Lightning Reserves 6 (OT)
Evansville Crush qualify for US Arena Open Cup Round of 16

Group Matches Sat. Nov. 13, 2010
11:00am - Cincinnati Saints 7, B.R.S.C. 5
12:00pm - Indiana U. 5, Rochester Rhinos-Indiana 2
1:00pm - FC Indiana 3, A.A.F.C. 3
2:00pm - Madison Fire 4, U. of Illinois 0
3:00pm - Cincinnati Saints 6, Rochester Rhinos-Indiana 2
4:00pm - B.R.S.C. 6, Indiana U. 4
5:00pm - Madison Fire 3, FC Indiana 1
6:00pm - A.A.F.C. 8, U. of Illinois 5

Group Matches Sun. Nov. 14, 2010
9:00am - B.R.S.C. 7, Rochester Rhinos-Indiana 1
10:00am - Madison Fire 4, A.A.F.C. 3
11:00am - Cincinnati Saints 7, Indiana U. 1
12:00pm - FC Indiana 6, U. of Illinois 2

Semifinals Sun. Nov. 14, 2010
1:30pm - B.R.S.C. 5, Madison Fire 3
2:30pm - A.A.F.C. 6, Cincinnati Saints 4

Final Sun. Nov. 14, 2010
4:00pm - B.R.S.C. 5, A.A.F.C. 4
B.R.S.C. qualify for US Arena Open Cup Round of 16, drop out, and replaced by runner up, A.A.F.C.

Group Matches Sat. Nov. 27, 2010; 12:00pm–8:00pm
Agudelo 13, SEA United 0
Balls Deep 2, DESNA 2
Big Danglers 2, Oly Boys 2
Dream Team 8, Rangers 1
Doyles 8, SEA United 0
Agudelo 3, Balls Deep 0
Oly Boys 3, Doyles 0
Rangers 2, DESNA 1
Doyles 3, Big Danglers 2
Dream Team 7, Agudelo 0
Oly Boys 5, Rangers 1
Balls Deep 4, Big Danglers 2
DESNA 2, SEA United 0
Dream Team 4, Doyles 0

Semifinals Sat. Nov. 27, 2010
Dream Team 3, Doyles 2
Agudelo 4, Oly Boys 3

Finals Sat. Nov. 27, 2010
Dream Team 4, Agudelo 2
Dream Team qualify for US Arena Open Cup Round of 16

Group Matches Sat. Nov. 6, 2010
2:00pm - Sequoia FC 8, McFarland Cougars 2
2:00pm - Turlock Express 5, Internacional 2
2:45pm - McFarland Cougars 1, Chico Bigfoot 7
2:45pm - Internacional 1, Top Notch San Jose  7
3:30pm - Sequoia FC 3, Chico Bigfoot 1
3:30pm - Top Notch San Jose 4, Turlock Express 1

Quarterfinals Sat. Nov. 6, 2010
4:15pm - Turlock Express 6, McFarland Cougars 1
4:15pm - Chico Bigfoot 8, Internacional 2

Semifinals Sat. Nov. 6, 2010
5:00pm - Sequoia FC 4, Turlock Express 0
5:00pm - Top Notch San Jose 4, Chico Bigfoot 1

Finals Sat. Nov. 6, 2010
6:00pm - Sequoia FC 4, Top Notch San Jose 2
Sequoia FC qualify for US Arena Open Cup Round of 16, drop out, and replaced by runner up, Top Notch San Jose

Group Matches Sat. Dec. 4, 2010
9:00am - San Diego Fusion 12, CF Revolucion Tijuana 4
10:00am - Arizona Heat 4, San Diego Crew 1
11:00am - Los Angeles Bolts 6, Oceanside All-Stars 3
12:00pm - San Diego Crew 14, San Marcos All-Stars 2
1:00pm - San Diego Fusion 12, Oceanside All-Stars 3
2:00pm - Arizona Heat 12, San Marcos All-Stars 2
3:00pm -  CF Revolucion Tijuana 5, Los Angeles Bolts 4

Quarterfinals Sun. Dec. 5, 2010
9:00am - CF Revolucion Tijuana 4, San Diego Crew 3
11:00am - Los Angeles Bolts 12, Oceanside All-Stars 2

Semifinals Sun. Dec. 5, 2010
12:00pm - San Diego Fusion 8, CF Revolucion Tijuana 2
1:00pm - Arizona Heat 7, Los Angeles Bolts 2

Finals Sun. Dec. 5, 2010
2:30pm - San Diego Fusion 2, Arizona Heat 1
San Diego Fusion qualify for US Arena Open Cup Round of 16

Point System: Win = 10 Pts, Tie = 5 Pts, Shut Out = 1 Pt(No Pts for 0-0 Tie), Goals = 1 Pt for Every Goal Up To 5, 1 Pt Deduction for Every Red Card Given To a Player or a Coach

Rocky Mountain Qualifying - Sun. Nov. 14, 2010 (at Edwards, Colorado)

Fort Collins Fury qualify for US Arena Open Cup Round of 16

References

United States Open Cup for Arena Soccer
United States Open Cup for Arena Soccer
Open Cup for Arena Soccer
Open Cup for Arena Soccer
United States